Vladimir Aleksandrovich Torban (10 December 1932 – 19 August 2011) was a Soviet basketball player. He trained as a tennis player in the 1940s and only in the 1950s started playing basketball for Dynamo Moscow. Between 1955 and 1959 he was a member of the Soviet team. In 1955, he won a gold medal at the Summer Universiade and a bronze medal at the EuroBasket 1955. Next year, he won a silver medal at the 1956 Summer Olympics. He became European champion in 1957 and 1959; in 1959, he also won a national title and competed at the world championship, where he held the highest live scoring rate (57%). However, his team was disqualified for refusing to play against Taiwan.

References

1932 births
2011 deaths
Olympic basketball players of the Soviet Union
Basketball players at the 1956 Summer Olympics
Olympic silver medalists for the Soviet Union
FIBA EuroBasket-winning players
Olympic medalists in basketball
Soviet men's basketball players
1959 FIBA World Championship players
Medalists at the 1956 Summer Olympics
Universiade medalists in basketball
Universiade gold medalists for the Soviet Union